Adrian Schrinner is the incumbent Lord Mayor of Brisbane. He was sworn in on 8 April 2019 after outgoing Lord Mayor Graham Quirk announced his resignation, Schrinner was endorsed by the LNP Party Room on 31 March 2019 as Quirk's successor. He has represented the ward of Chandler for the Liberal National Party of Queensland since September 2005.

Schrinner was elected Deputy Mayor in April 2011 after the post was vacated by incoming Lord Mayor Graham Quirk. Schrinner is the youngest person in Brisbane's history to be in the position.

On 28 March 2020, Schrinner was popularly elected to the Lord Mayoralty defeating Labor's candidate, Patrick Condren.

Early life 
Schrinner was raised in Brisbane's south-eastern suburbs and attended Citipointe Christian College in Mansfield, Queensland.

A keen amateur pilot, Schrinner qualified to fly light aircraft solo at age sixteen. After leaving school he commenced training to become an officer in the Royal Australian Air Force.

He holds a Bachelor of Arts from the University of Queensland.

Political career

Newman Administration 
Schrinner stood for the Chandler Ward by-election in September 2005 after the previous councillor Michael Caltabiano was elected to state parliament.

Following the 2008 election, the Lord Mayor appointed Schrinner as the Chairman of the Finance and Administration Committee. This committee was later expanded to become the Finance, Administration and Economic Development Committee.

Quirk Administration 
Following the resignation of Campbell Newman as Lord Mayor in March 2011, the Council appointed Deputy Mayor Graham Quirk to fill the role of Lord Mayor until the 2012 election. At the same meeting, Schrinner was elected as Deputy Mayor.

The Quirk Administration was elected in its own right in April 2012 and Schrinner continued to serve as Deputy Mayor following the election.

Following the election, the Lord Mayor appointed Schrinner chair of the Infrastructure Committee. This role included oversight of major projects such as the $1.5 billion Legacy Way Tunnel, open level crossing eliminations at Bald Hills and Geebung and the reconstruction of the New Farm Riverwalk after the 2011 Queensland floods. He also trialled and successfully introduced pedestrian countdown timers at traffic signals across the city.

In 2014 he led the Brisbane Parking Taskforce, which aimed to reform car parking management across the city. The package of measures included the introduction of 15-minute free parking at more than 7,000 metered spaces.

In March 2016 election, the Quirk Administration was returned with an increased majority and Schrinner was re-elected Deputy Mayor unopposed.

Following the election, Schrinner was tasked with chairing the Public and Active Transport Committee, with special responsibility for the Brisbane Metro project.

Following the resignation of Graham Quirk, Schrinner succeeded Quirk as Lord Mayor.

Personal life 
Schrinner lives in the suburb of Carindale, Queensland. He and his wife Nina have four children, Octavia, Wolfgang, Monash and Petra.

He has supported and assisted a wide range of local community groups. These include environment and bushcare groups, sporting groups, P&C Associations, church groups and charities, Neighbourhood Watch groups and seniors associations.

Adrian is the patron of the Tramway Museum at Ferny Grove. He is also vice patron for the Queensland Target Sports Inc., home of the Queensland Olympic Rifle sports shooting disciplines in Belmont.

Adrian is a member and former State Councillors of the Australian National Flag Association of Queensland. This organisation aims to promote the importance of the Australian flag and campaigns to prevent it from being changed in the future.

References

Living people
Mayors and Lord Mayors of Brisbane
People from Brisbane
Liberal National Party of Queensland politicians
Queensland local councillors
University of Queensland alumni
Year of birth missing (living people)